is a Japanese politician serving in the House of Representatives in the Diet (national legislature) as a member of the Democratic Party of Japan. A native of Amakusa District, Kumamoto, he attended Nihon University as undergraduate and graduate students and Keio University as a research student. He was elected for the first time in 2003 after unsuccessful runs in 1998 and 2000.

Sonoda became internationally known for drinking a glass of water, collected from puddles under the reactor buildings at the radioactively polluted Fukushima Daiichi Nuclear Power Plant, during a press conference to prove the safety of the installed decontamination procedures.

References

External links
 Official website in Japanese.

Living people
1967 births
Democratic Party of Japan politicians
Members of the House of Representatives (Japan)
Nihon University alumni
21st-century Japanese politicians